The 2003 Washington State Cougars football team represented Washington State University as a member of Pacific-10 Conference during the 2003 NCAA Division I-A football season. Led by first-year head coach Bill Doba, the Cougars compiled an overall record of 10–3 with a mark of 6–2 in conference play, finished second in the Pac-10 behind champion USC. Washington State was invited to the Holiday Bowl in San Diego, where the Cougars defeated fifth-ranked Texas and moved up to ninth in the final rankings. The team played home games on campus at Martin Stadium in Pullman, Washington.

Schedule

References

Washington State
Washington State Cougars football seasons
Holiday Bowl champion seasons
Washington State Cougars football